Svetlana Parkhomenko and Larisa Savchenko were the defending champions but only Parkhomenko competed that year with Natalia Bykova.

Bykova and Parkhomenko won in the final 6–3, 6–4 against Jana Novotná and Catherine Suire.

Seeds
Champion seeds are indicated in bold text while text in italics indicates the round in which those seeds were eliminated.

 Jana Novotná /  Catherine Suire (final)
 Natalia Bykova /  Svetlana Parkhomenko (champions)
 Anna-Maria Fernandez /  Peanut Harper (first round)
 Dianne Balestrat /  Catherine Tanvier (first round)

Draw

References
 1988 Virginia Slims of Kansas Doubles Draw

Virginia Slims of Kansas
1988 WTA Tour